The 1935 South Dakota Coyotes football team was an American football team that represented the University of South Dakota in the North Central Conference (NCC) during the 1935 college football season. In its second season under head coach Harry Gamage, the team compiled a 5–3–1 record (1–3–1 against NCC opponents), finished in fourth place out of seven teams in the NCC, and was outscored by a total of 126 to 83. The team played its home games at Inman Field in Vermillion, South Dakota.

Schedule

References

South Dakota
South Dakota Coyotes football seasons
South Dakota Coyotes football